The Instituto de Arqueología Amazónica (IAA, Amazon Archaeology Institute) is a non-profit research center organisation affiliated to the National Institute of Culture of Peru

The present director is   Dr. Federico Kauffmann Doig, and is operated in combination with  the Center Studi Ricerche Ligabue (Italy),  whose director is the anthropologist and paleontologist Dr . Giancarlo Ligabue,

These centers have the purpose of investigating the history behind the Amazonian Peruvian Andes.

External links 
Instituto de Arqueología Amazónica

Archaeological research institutes
Research institutes in Peru
Upper Amazon